Oriana Fallaci (29 June 1929 – 15 September 2006) was an Italian journalist and author. A partisan during World War II, she had a long and successful journalistic career. Fallaci became famous worldwide for her coverage of war and revolution, and her "long, aggressive and revealing interviews" with many world leaders during the 1960s, 1970s, and 1980s.

Her book Interview with History contains interviews with Indira Gandhi, Golda Meir, Yasser Arafat, Zulfikar Ali Bhutto, Willy Brandt, Shah of Iran Mohammad Reza Pahlavi, and Henry Kissinger, South Vietnamese President Nguyễn Văn Thiệu, and North Vietnamese General Võ Nguyên Giáp during the Vietnam War. The interview with Kissinger was published in Playboy, with Kissinger describing himself as "the cowboy who leads the wagon train by riding ahead alone on his horse". Kissinger later wrote that it was "the single most disastrous conversation I have ever had with any member of the press". She also interviewed Deng Xiaoping, Andreas Papandreou, Ayatollah Khomeini, Haile Selassie, Lech Wałęsa, Muammar Gaddafi, Mário Soares, George Habash, and Alfred Hitchcock, among others. After retirement, she returned to the spotlight after writing a series of controversial articles and books critical of Islam that aroused condemnation as well as support.

Early life 
Fallaci was born in Florence, Italy, on 29 June 1929. Her father Edoardo Fallaci, a cabinet maker in Florence, was a political activist struggling to put an end to the dictatorship of Italian fascist leader Benito Mussolini. During World War II she joined the Italian anti-fascist resistance movement, Giustizia e Libertà, part of Resistenza. She later received a certificate for valour from the Italian army. In a 1976 retrospective collection of her works, she remarked:

Career

Beginning as a journalist 
After attaining her secondary school diploma, Fallaci briefly attended the University of Florence where she studied medicine and chemistry. She later transferred to Literature but soon dropped out and never finished her studies. It was her uncle Bruno Fallaci, himself a journalist, who suggested to young Oriana to dedicate herself to journalism. Fallaci began her career in journalism during her teens, becoming a special correspondent for the Italian paper Il mattino dell'Italia centrale in 1946. Beginning in 1967, she worked as a war correspondent covering Vietnam, the Indo-Pakistani War, the Middle East, and in South America.

1960s 
For many years, Fallaci was a special correspondent for the political magazine L'Europeo, and wrote for a number of leading newspapers and the magazine Epoca. In Mexico City, during the 1968 Tlatelolco massacre, Fallaci was shot three times by Mexican soldiers, dragged downstairs by her hair, and left for dead. Her eyewitness account became important evidence disproving the Mexican government's denials that a massacre had taken place.

In the 1960s she began conducting interviews, first with people in the world of literature and cinema (published in book form in 1963 as Gli antipatici) and later with world leaders (published in the 1973 book Intervista con la storia), which have led some to describe her as "during the 1970s and 80s the most famous – and feared – interviewer in the world".

1970s 
In the early 1970s, Fallaci had a relationship with the subject of one of her interviews, Alexandros Panagoulis, who had been a solitary figure in the Greek resistance against the 1967 dictatorship, having been captured, heavily tortured and imprisoned for his (unsuccessful) assassination attempt on dictator and ex-Colonel Georgios Papadopoulos. Panagoulis died in 1976, under controversial circumstances, in a road accident. Fallaci maintained that Panagoulis was assassinated by remnants of the Greek military junta and her book Un Uomo (A Man) was inspired by his life.

During her 1972 interview with Henry Kissinger, Kissinger stated that the Vietnam War was a "useless war" and compared himself to "the cowboy who leads the wagon train by riding ahead alone on his horse". Kissinger later claimed that it was "the single most disastrous conversation I have ever had with any member of the press". In 1973, she interviewed Mohammad Reza Pahlavi. She later stated, "He considers women simply as graceful ornaments, incapable of thinking like a man, and then strives to give them complete equality of rights and duties".

During her 1979 interview with Ayatollah Khomeini, she addressed him as a "tyrant", and managed to unveil herself from the chador:

1980s 
In 1980 Fallaci interviewed Deng Xiaoping. Michael Rank described this interview as the "most revealing ever of any Chinese leader by any western journalist", during which Deng spoke frankly about Mao "extraordinarily frankly by Chinese standards" whereas most Western interviews with Chinese leaders have been "bland and dull".

Retirement 
Living in New York City and in a house she owned in Tuscany, Fallaci lectured at the University of Chicago, Yale University, Harvard University and Columbia University.

After 9/11 

After 11 September 2001, Fallaci wrote three books critical of Islamic extremists and Islam in general, and in both writing and interviews warned that Europe was "too tolerant of Muslims". The first book was The Rage and the Pride (initially a four-page article in Corriere della Sera, the major national newspaper in Italy). In this book, she calls for the destruction of what is now called Islam.

She wrote that "sons of Allah breed like rats", and in a Wall Street Journal interview in 2005, she said that Europe was no longer Europe but "Eurabia". The Rage and the Pride and The Force of Reason both became bestsellers, the former selling over one million copies in Italy and 500,000 in the rest of Europe, and are considered part of the "Eurabia genre". Her third book in the same vein, "The Apocalypse", Oriana Fallaci intervista sé stessa - L'Apocalisse, sold some two million copies globally, the three books together selling four million copies in Italy.

Her writings have been translated into 21 languages, including English, Spanish, French, Dutch, German, Portuguese, Urdu, Greek, Swedish, Polish, Hungarian, Hebrew, Romanian, Serbo-Croatian, Persian, Slovenian, Danish and Bulgarian.

Personal life and death 

On 27 August 2005, Fallaci had a private audience with Pope Benedict XVI at Castel Gandolfo. Although an atheist, Fallaci reportedly had great respect for the Pope and expressed admiration for his 2004 essay titled "If Europe Hates Itself". Despite being an atheist, in The Force of Reason, she claimed that she was also a "Christian atheist". Fallaci was a vocal critic of Islam, especially after the Iranian Revolution and the 9/11 attacks. When rumors of the construction of an Islamic center in the city of Siena intensified, Fallaci told The New Yorker "If the Muslims build this Islamic center, she will blow it up with the help of her friends".

Fallaci died on 15 September 2006, in her native Florence, from cancer. She was buried in the Cimitero Evangelico degli Allori in the southern suburb of Florence, Galluzzo, alongside her family members and a stone memorial to Alexandros Panagoulis, her late companion.

Legacy 
As of 2018, streets or squares have been renamed after her in Pisa and Arezzo, in central Italy, and Genoa, further north.

A public garden has also been dedicated to her in Sesto San Giovanni, an industrial town close to Milan.

In July 2019, the lower chamber of the Italian Parliament approved the creation of low-denomination treasury bills that could also be used as a de facto parallel currency to the euro. According to the plan's main proponent, the League's MP Claudio Borghi, the 20 euro bill should bear a picture of Fallaci.

Awards 
Fallaci twice received the St. Vincent Prize for journalism (1967, 1971). She also received the Bancarella Prize (1970) for Nothing, and So Be It; Viareggio Prize (1979), for Un uomo: Romanzo; and Prix Antibes, 1993, for Inshallah. She received a D.Litt. from Columbia College (Chicago).

On 30 November 2005, in New York City, Fallaci received the Annie Taylor Award for courage from the Center for the Study of Popular Culture. She was honored for the "heroism and the values" that rendered her "a symbol of the fight against Islamic fascism and a knight of the freedom of humankind". The Annie Taylor Award is annually awarded to people who have demonstrated unusual courage in adverse conditions and great danger. David Horowitz, founder of the center, described Fallaci as "a General in the fight for freedom". On 8 December 2005, Fallaci was awarded the Ambrogino d'oro (Golden Ambrogino), the highest recognition of the city of Milan. She also received the Jan Karski Eagle Award.

Acting on a proposal by Minister of Education Letizia Moratti, on 14 December 2005, the President of the Italian Republic, Carlo Azeglio Ciampi, awarded Fallaci a gold medal for her cultural contributions (Benemerita della Cultura). The state of her health prevented her from attending the ceremony. She wrote in a speech: "This gold medal moves me because it gratifies my efforts as writer and journalist, my front line engagement to defend our culture, love for my country and for freedom. My current well known health situation prevents me from traveling and receiving in person this gift that for me, a woman not used to medals and not too keen on trophies, has an intense ethical and moral significance".

On 12 February 2006, the President of Tuscany, Riccardo Nencini, awarded Fallaci a gold medal from the Council of Tuscany. Nencini reported that the prize was awarded as Fallaci was  During the award ceremony, held in New York City, the writer talked about her attempt to create a caricature of Mohammed, in reply to the polemic relating to similar caricatures that had appeared in French and Dutch newspapers. 

America Award of the Italy–USA Foundation in 2010 (in memory).

Controversy 
Fallaci received much public attention for her controversial writings and statements on Islam and European Muslims. Fallaci considered Islamic fundamentalism to be a revival of the fascism she fought against in her youth, that politicians in Europe were misunderstanding the threat of Islam in the same way that their 1930s equivalents misunderstood the threat of German fascism; she denied that "moderate Islam" actually existed, calling it a mendacity. Cristina De Stefano argued that "the center of her political ideas and her obsession was not Islam— it was fascism. For her, the first stage of fascism is to silence people; and for her, political Islam is another form of fascism." Both support and opposition have been published in Italian newspapers (among which, La Repubblica and Corriere della Sera had a series of articles), and David Holcberg, at the Ayn Rand Institute, supported her cause with a letter to The Washington Times.

Fallaci received criticism as well as support in Italy, where her books have sold over one million copies. At the first European Social Forum, which was held in Florence in November 2002, Fallaci invited the people of Florence to cease commercial operations and stay home. Furthermore, she compared the ESF to the Nazi occupation of Florence. Protest organizers declared, "We have done it for Oriana, because she hasn't spoken in public for the last 12 years, and hasn't been laughing in the last 50".

In 2002, in Switzerland, the Islamic Center and the Somal Association of Geneva, SOS Racisme of Lausanne, along with a private citizen, sued Fallaci for the allegedly racist content of The Rage and the Pride. In November 2002 a Swiss judge issued an arrest warrant for violations of article 261 and 261 bis of the Swiss criminal code and requested the Italian government to either prosecute or extradite her. Italian Minister of Justice Roberto Castelli rejected the request on the grounds that the Constitution of Italy protects freedom of speech.

In May 2005, Adel Smith, president of the Union of Italian Muslims, launched a lawsuit against Fallaci charging that "some of the things she said in her book The Force of Reason are offensive to Islam". Smith's attorney cited 18 phrases, most notably a reference to Islam as "a pool that never purifies". Consequently, an Italian judge ordered Fallaci to stand trial in Bergamo on charges of "defaming Islam". The preliminary trial began on 12 June, and on 25 June, Judge Beatrice Siccardi decided that Fallaci should indeed stand trial beginning on 18 December. Fallaci accused the judge of having disregarded the fact that Smith had called for her murder and defamed Christianity.

In France, some Arab-Muslim and anti-defamation organisations such as MRAP and Ligue des Droits de l'Homme launched lawsuits against Oriana Fallaci, charging that The Rage and the Pride and The Force of Reason (La Rage et l'Orgueil and La Force de la Raison in their French versions) were "offensive to Islam" and "racist". Her lawyer, Gilles William Goldnadel, president of the France-Israel Organization, was also Alexandre del Valle's lawyer during similar lawsuits against del Valle.

On 3 June 2005, Fallaci had published on the front page of the Corriere della Sera a highly controversial article titled "Noi Cannibali e i figli di Medea" ("We cannibals and Medea's offspring"), urging women not to vote for a public referendum about artificial insemination that was held on 12 and 13 June 2006.

In her 2004 book Oriana Fallaci intervista sé stessa – L'Apocalisse, Fallaci expressed her opposition to same-sex marriage, arguing that it "subvert[s] the biological concept of family" and calling it "a fashionable whim, a form of exhibitionism", and also against parenting by same-sex couples, declaring it a "distorted view of life". She also asserted the existence of a "gay lobby", through which "the homosexuals themselves are discriminating against others".

In the June 2006 issue of Reason, American libertarian writer Cathy Young wrote: "Oriana Fallaci's 2002 book The Rage and the Pride makes hardly any distinction between radical Islamic terrorists and Somali street vendors who supposedly urinate on the corners of Italy's great cities." Christopher Hitchens, writing in The Atlantic, called the book "a sort of primer in how not to write about Islam", describing it as "replete with an obsessive interest in excrement, disease, sexual mania, and insectlike reproduction, insofar as these apply to Muslims in general and to Muslim immigrants in Europe in particular".

Bibliography 
I sette peccati di Hollywood, (The Seven Sins of Hollywood), preface by Orson Welles), Milan: Longanesi, 1958; Best BUR, 2014 (digital edition).
Il sesso inutile, viaggio intorno alla donna, Rizzoli, Milan, 1961; Best BUR, 2014 (digital edition); English translation (Pamela Swinglehurst, tr.): The Useless Sex: Voyage around the Woman, New York: Horizon Press, 1964.
Penelope alla guerra, Milan: Rizzoli, 1962; Best BUR, 2014 (digital edition); English translation, Penelope at War, London: Michael Joseph, 1966, Pamela Swinglehurst, tr.
Gli antipatici, Milan: Rizzoli, 1963; Best BUR, 2014 (digital edition); English translation (Pamela Swinglehurst, tr.): Limelighters, London: Michael Joseph, 1967, and The Egotists: Sixteen Surprising Interviews, Chicago: Regnery, 1968. Interviews with Norman Mailer, Sean Connery, Ingrid Bergman, Nguyen Cao Ky, H. Rap Brown, Geraldine Chaplin, Hugh Hefner, Frederico Fellini, Sammy Davis, Jr., Anna Magnani, Jeanne Moreau, Dean Martin, Duchess of Alba, Alfred Hitchcock, Mary Hemingway, and El Cordobes.
Se il Sole muore, Milan: Rizzoli, 1965; Best BUR, 2010 (digital edition); English translation (Pamela Swinglehurst, tr.): If the Sun Dies: New York, Atheneum, 1966, and London: Collins, 1967. About the US space program.
Niente, e cosí sia, Milan: Rizzoli, 1969; Best BUR, 2010 (digital edition); English translation (Isabel Quigly, tr.): Nothing, And So Be It: A Personal Search for Meaning in War, New York: Doubleday, 1972, and Nothing and Amen, London: Michael Joseph, 1972. A report on the Vietnam War based on personal experiences.
Quel giorno sulla Luna, Milan: Rizzoli, 1972; Best BUR, 2010 (digital edition).
Intervista con la storia, Milan: Rizzoli, 1974; Best BR, 2008 (digital edition); English translation (John Shepley, tr.): Interview with History, New York: Liveright Publishing Corporation, 1976; London: Michael Joseph, 1976; Boston: Houghton Mifflin Company, 1977. A collection of interviews with sixteen political figures.
Lettera a un bambino mai nato, Milan: Rizzoli, 1975; Best BUR, 2014 (digital edition); English translation (John Shepley, tr.): Letter to a Child Never Born, New York: Simon & Schuster, 1976, and London: Arlington Books, 1976. A dialogue between a mother and her eventually miscarried child.
Un uomo: Romanzo, Milan: Rizzoli, 1979; Best BUR, 2010 (digital edition); English translation (William Weaver, tr.): A Man, New York: Simon & Schuster, 1980. A novel about Alexandros Panagoulis, a Greek revolutionary hero who fights alone and to the death for freedom and truth.
Insciallah, Milan: Rizzoli, 1990; Best BUR, 2014 (digital edition); English translation (by Oriana Fallaci, working from a translation by James Marcus): Inshallah, New York: Doubleday, 1992, and London: Chatto & Windus, 1992. A fictional account of Italian troops stationed in Lebanon in 1983.
La Rabbia e l'orgoglio Milan: Rizzoli, 2001; English translation: The Rage and the Pride, New York: Rizzoli, 2002. . A post-11 September manifesto.
La Forza della ragione, Milan: Rizzoli, 2004; Best BUR, 2014 (digital edition); English translation: The Force of Reason, New York: Rizzoli International, 2004. . A sequel to La Rabbia e l'orgoglio (The Rage and the Pride).
Oriana Fallaci intervista Oriana Fallaci, Milan: Corriere della Sera, August 2004; not translated into English. Fallaci interviews herself on the subject of "Eurabia" and "Islamofascism".
Oriana Fallaci intervista sé stessa – L'Apocalisse, Milan: Rizzoli, 2004. An update (in Italian) of the interview with herself. A new, long epilogue is added.
Un cappello pieno di ciliegie, Milan: Rizzoli, 2008; BURbig, 2010 (digital edition); not translated into English. A novel about her ancestors, published two years after her death. Fallaci worked on it for ten years, until the 11 September attacks and her books inspired by them.
Intervista con il mito, Milan: Rizzoli, 2010; Best BUR, 2010 (digital edition).
Le radici dell'odio: La mia verità sull'Islam, Milan: Rizzoli Vintage, 2015; BUR Rizzoli, 2016 (digital edition).

See also 
Robert Spencer
Steven Emerson
Daniel Pipes
Bat Ye'or
Alexandre del Valle
Tiziano Terzani

References

Further reading 

Obituaries
"Combative Writer Oriana Fallaci Dies" by Alexandra Rizzo, Associated Press, 15 September 2006.
"Eulogy: Oriana Fallaci and the Art of the Interview" by Christopher Hitchens, Vanity Fair, December 2006.
Oriana Fallaci, Daily Telegraph, 16 September 2006.
"Oriana" by Michael Ledeen

Articles by Fallaci
"E a Oriana diceva: voi ci massacrate", Corriere della Sera, 2 December 1979 - interview (in Italian) with Muammar Gaddafi
Rage & Pride by Oriana Fallaci, English translation by Letizia Grasso, from the four-page essay "La Rabbia e l'Orgoglio", that appeared in Italy's leading newspaper Corriere della Sera on 29 September 2001. (Note that the official edition by Rizzoli is translated by Fallaci herself)
Rage and Pride, as translated by Chris Knipp
On Jew-Hatred in Europe, by Columnist Oriana Fallaci, IMRA – 25 April 2002 (Originally published in Italian in the Panorama magazine, 17 April 2002).
Oriana Fallaci audio interview, with Stephen Banker circa 1972

Articles about Fallaci
"The Life of Oriana Fallaci, Guerrilla Journalist" by Dwight Garner, The New York Times, 16 October 2017.
The "Interview that Became Henry Kissinger's 'Most Disastrous Decision': How Oriana Fallaci Became the Most Feared Political Interviewer in the World" by Cristina De Stefano. 20 October 2017.
"Oriana Fallaci: The last diva journalist"  by Pieter Colpaert, womenintheworld.com, 16 October 2017.
"Golda and Oriana: A Romance", in: The Prime Ministers: An Intimate Narrative of Israeli Leadership by Yehuda Avner (2010). 
The Slow Suicide of the West, by Jorge Majfud
Rage and Pride Ignites a Firestorm – On the reception of "Rage and Pride" By Michael San Filippo, guide to Italian Language at about.com.
"Prophet of Decline: An interview with Oriana Fallaci" by Tunku Varadarajan in The Wall Street Journal
"The Agitator: Oriana Fallaci directs her fury toward Islam" by Margaret Talbot in The New Yorker, 29 May 2006
Oriana Fallaci—The Enjoyment of Hate by Judy Harris in ZNet, 17 September 2006
Review of Santo L. Arico's Oriana Fallaci: The Woman and the Myth by Linda Steiner, H-Net: Humanities & Social Sciences Online, February 2003.
"The Rage of Oriana Fallaci" by George Gurley, The New York Observer, 27 January 2003.
"Oriana Fallaci, an Interviewer Who Goes for the Jugular in Four Languages" by Judy Klemesrud, The New York Times, 25 January 1973.

Books about Fallaci
John Gatt-Rutter, Oriana Fallaci: The Rhetoric of Freedom, Oxford and Dulles, VA: Berg, 1996 (New Directions in European Writing series).
Santo L. Aricò, Oriana Fallaci: The Woman and the Myth. Carbondale, Ill. and Edwardsville, Ill.: Southern Illinois University Press, 1998/2010.
Santo L. Aricò, The Unmasking of Oriana Fallaci: Part II and Conclusion to Her Life, Pittsburgh: Rose Dog Books, 2013.
Cristina De Stefano, Oriana, una donna. Milan: Rizzoli, 2013; English translation: Oriana Fallaci: The Journalist, the Agitator, the Legend, New York: Other Press, 2017, translated from the Italian by Marina Harss.

External links 
 Oriana Fallaci – life, books, articles, interviews, clippings, photos and videos. (Archived version here.)
 Oriana Fallaci – quotations in original Italian

1929 births
2006 deaths
Journalists from Florence
Members of Giustizia e Libertà
Deaths from lung cancer
Italian atheists
Italian anti-fascists
Action Party (Italy) politicians
20th-century Italian politicians
Deaths from cancer in Tuscany
Critics of Islam
Eurabia
Anti-Islam sentiment in Italy
Bancarella Prize winners
Italian women journalists
Italian women novelists
20th-century Italian women writers
Politicians from Florence
Italian war correspondents
21st-century Italian writers
21st-century Italian novelists
20th-century Italian novelists
21st-century novelists
21st-century Italian journalists
20th-century Italian journalists
Italian emigrants to the United States
War correspondents of the Vietnam War
21st-century Italian women writers